Imst (Southern Bavarian: Imscht) is a town in the Austrian federal state of Tyrol. With a current population (2013) of 9,552, Imst is the administrative centre of Imst District.

History 

Licensed since 1282 to hold a regular market. 
Until 1918, the town (named earlier also JMST) was part of the Austrian monarchy (Austria side after the compromise of 1867), head of the district of the same name, one of the 21 Bezirkshauptmannschaften in the Tyrol province.

Imst received full town rights in 1898.

Schemenlaufen
Every four years Imst hosts their Fasnacht, or carnival before Lent. This carnival is listed by UNESCO as one of their Lists of Intangible Cultural Heritage. As part of Schemenlaufen pairs of men wear bells, tuned differently, while performing dances of jumps and bows. They are accompanied by masked characters imitating their dance.

Luge track 
In 1958, the first artificially refrigerated luge track was completed at Imst. The track was 1000.9 meters long with 17 turns and a vertical drop of 124.8 meters, giving the track an average grade of 12.48%. No turn names were given for the track.

It hosted the FIL World Luge Championships in 1963 and 1978 and it hosted the FIL European Luge Championships in 1956, 1971, and 1974.

SOS Children's Village 
In 1949 Hermann Gmeiner founded the first SOS Children's Village in the Sonnberg district of Imst. The SOS-Kinderdörfer organization now runs over 450 such villages worldwide.

Climate

Sons and daughters of the town
 Theodor von Hörmann (1840–1895), landscape painter
 Friedrich Heinrich Suso Denifle (1844–1905), church historian, Dominican, professor in Graz
 Alfons Gorbach (1898–1972), politician (ÖVP), Federal Chancellor of Austria from 1961 to 1964

Notes and references

Official Imst town council website (in German)
Imst-Gurgltal tourist site 
Website of SOS-Kinderdorf international

External links

Bobsleigh, luge, and skeleton tracks
Sports venues in Austria
Lechtal Alps
Cities and towns in Imst District
Populated places on the Inn (river)
Mieming Range